Yang Yang (born 14 September 1977 in Changchun, Jilin, China) is a Chinese Olympic speed skater of Hui ethnicity.

Yang competed as a short track speed skater for the Chinese national team at the 1994 Winter Olympics, the 1998 Winter Olympics, and the 2002 Winter Olympics.

Born 1977, Yang is sometimes known as Yang Yang (S), to differentiate her from the speed skater named Yang Yang born in 1976 (known as "Yang Yang (A)").

By coincidence, Yang had a one-year and one month older contemporary on the Chinese short track team also named Yang Yang in English and pinyin, although with a different given name in Chinese characters. They were originally referred to as Yang Yang (L) ("大杨扬") and Yang Yang (S) ("小杨阳"), for "Large" and "Small"; Yang Yang (L) disliked the "L" designation and changed her designation to Yang Yang (A). "A" and "S" also refer to their respective months of birth: August and September respectively.

References

External links 
 

1977 births
Living people
Chinese female speed skaters
Chinese female short track speed skaters
Olympic short track speed skaters of China
Olympic silver medalists for China
Olympic bronze medalists for China
Olympic medalists in short track speed skating
Short track speed skaters at the 1994 Winter Olympics
Short track speed skaters at the 1998 Winter Olympics
Short track speed skaters at the 2002 Winter Olympics
Medalists at the 2002 Winter Olympics
Medalists at the 1998 Winter Olympics
Asian Games medalists in short track speed skating
Short track speed skaters at the 1996 Asian Winter Games
Short track speed skaters at the 1999 Asian Winter Games
Speed skaters from Changchun
Medalists at the 1996 Asian Winter Games
Medalists at the 1999 Asian Winter Games
Asian Games gold medalists for China
Asian Games bronze medalists for China
Universiade gold medalists for China
Universiade medalists in short track speed skating
Competitors at the 1995 Winter Universiade
20th-century Chinese women
21st-century Chinese women